Resonant inelastic X-ray scattering (RIXS) is an X-ray spectroscopy technique used to investigate the electronic structure of molecules and materials.

Inelastic X-ray scattering is a fast developing experimental technique in which one scatters high energy, X-ray photons inelastically off matter. It is a photon-in/photon-out  spectroscopy where one measures both the energy and momentum change of the scattered photon. The energy and momentum lost by the photon are transferred to intrinsic excitations of the material under study and thus RIXS provides information about those excitations.  The RIXS process can also be described as a resonant X-ray Raman or resonant X-ray emission process.

RIXS is a resonant technique because the energy of the incident photon is chosen such that it coincides with, and hence resonates with, one of the atomic X-ray absorption edges of the system. The resonance can greatly enhance the inelastic scattering cross section, sometimes by many orders of magnitude.

The RIXS event can be thought of as a two-step process. Starting from the initial state, absorption of an incident photon leads to creation of an excited intermediate state, that has a core hole. From this state, emission of a photon leads to the final state. In a simplified picture the absorption process gives information of the empty electronic states, while the emission gives information about the occupied states. In the RIXS experiment these two pieces of information come together in a convolved manner, strongly perturbed by the core-hole potential in the intermediate state.

RIXS studies can be performed using both soft and hard X-rays.

Features

Compared to other scattering techniques, RIXS has a number of unique features:  it covers a large scattering phase-space, is polarization dependent, element and orbital specific, bulk sensitive and requires only small sample volumes.

In RIXS one measures both the energy and momentum change of the scattered photon. Comparing the energy of a neutron, electron or photon with a wavelength of the order of the relevant length scale in a solid— as given by the de Broglie equation considering the interatomic lattice spacing is in the order of Ångströms—it derives from the relativistic energy–momentum relation that an X-ray photon has more energy than a neutron or electron. The scattering phase space (the range of energies and momenta that can be transferred in a scattering event) of X-rays is therefore without equal. In particular, high-energy X-rays carry a momentum that is comparable to the inverse lattice spacing of typical condensed matter systems so that, unlike Raman scattering experiments with visible or infrared light, RIXS can probe the full dispersion of low energy excitations in solids.

RIXS can utilize the polarization of the photon: the nature of the excitations created in the material can be disentangled by a polarization analysis of the incident and scattered photons, which allow one, through the use of various selection rules, to characterize the symmetry and nature of the excitations.

RIXS is element and orbital specific: chemical sensitivity arises by tuning to the absorption edges of the different types of atoms in a material. RIXS can even differentiate between the same chemical element at sites with inequivalent chemical bondings, with different valencies or at inequivalent crystallographic positions as long as the X-ray absorption edges in these cases are distinguishable. In addition, the type of information on the electronic excitations of a system being probed can be varied by tuning to different X-ray edges (e.g., K, L or M) of the same chemical element, where the photon excites core-electrons into different valence orbitals.

RIXS is bulk sensitive: the penetration depth of resonant X-ray photons is material and scattering geometry- specific, but typically is on the order of a few micrometre in the hard X-ray regime (for example at transition metal K-edges) and on the order of 0.1 micrometre in the soft X-ray regime (e.g. transition metal L-edges).

RIXS needs only small sample volumes: the photon-matter interaction is relatively strong, compared to for instance the neutron-matter interaction strength. This makes RIXS possible on very small volume samples, thin films, surfaces and nano-objects, in addition to bulk single crystal or powder samples.

In principle RIXS can probe a very broad class of intrinsic excitations of the system under study—as long as the excitations are overall charge neutral. This constraint arises from the fact that in RIXS the scattered photons do not add or remove charge from the system under study. This implies that, in principle RIXS has a finite cross section for probing the energy, momentum and polarization dependence of any type of electron-hole excitation: for instance the electron-hole continuum and excitons in band metals and semiconductors, charge transfer and crystal field excitations in  strongly correlated materials, lattice excitations (phonons), orbital excitations, and so on. In addition magnetic excitations are also symmetry-allowed in RIXS, because the angular momentum that the photons carry can in principle be transferred to the electron's spin moment. Moreover, it has been theoretically shown that RIXS can probe Bogoliubov quasiparticles in high-temperature superconductors, and shed light on the nature and symmetry of the electron-electron pairing of the superconducting state.

Resolution
The energy and momentum resolution of RIXS do not depend on the core-hole that is present in the intermediate state. In general the natural linewidth of a spectral feature is determined by the life-times of initial and final states. In X-ray absorption and non-resonant emission spectroscopy, the resolution is often limited by the relatively short life-time of the final state core-hole. As in RIXS a high energy core-hole is absent in final state, this leads to intrinsically sharp spectra with energy and momentum resolution determined by the instrumentation. At the same time, RIXS experiments keep the advantages of X-ray probes, e.g., element specificity.

The elemental specificity of the experiments comes from tuning the incident X-ray energy to the binding energy of a core level of the element of interest.  One of the major technical challenges in RIXS experiments is selecting the monochromator and energy analyzer which produce, at the desired energy, the desired resolution.  Some of the feasible  crystal monochromator reflections and  energy analyzer reflections have been tabulated. The total energy resolution comes from a combination of the incident X-ray bandpass, the beam spot size at the sample, the bandpass of the energy analyzer (which works on the photons scattered by the sample) and the detector geometry.

Radiative inelastic X-ray scattering is a weak process, with a small cross section. RIXS experiments therefore require a high-brilliance X-ray source, and are only performed at synchrotron radiation sources. In recent years, the use of area sensitive  detectors has significantly decreased the counting time needed to collect one spectrum at a given energy resolution.

Direct and indirect RIXS

Resonant inelastic X-ray scattering processes are classified as either direct or indirect. This distinction is useful because the cross-sections for each are quite different.  When direct scattering is allowed, it will be the dominant scattering channel, with indirect processes contributing only in higher order. In contrast, for the large class of experiments for which direct scattering is forbidden, RIXS relies exclusively on indirect scattering channels.

Direct RIXS
In direct RIXS, the incoming photon promotes a core-electron to an empty valence band state. Subsequently, an electron from a different state decays and annihilates the core-hole. The hole in the final state may either be in a core level at lower binding energy than in the intermediate state or in the filled valence shell. Some authors refer to this technique as resonant X-ray emission spectroscopy (RXES). The distinction between RIXS, resonance X-ray Raman and RXES in the literature is not strict.

The net result is a final state with an electron-hole excitation, as an electron was created in an empty valence band state and a hole in a filled shell. If the hole is in the filled valence shell, the electron-hole excitation can propagate through the material, carrying away momentum and energy. Momentum and energy conservation require that these are equal to the momentum and energy loss of the scattered photon.

For direct RIXS to occur, both photoelectric transitions—the initial one from core to valence state and succeeding one to fill the core hole—must be possible. These transitions can for instance be an initial dipolar transition of 1s → 2p followed by the decay of another electron in the 2p band from 2p → 1s. This happens at the K-edge of oxygen, carbon and silicon. A very efficient sequence often used in 3d transition metals is a 1s → 3d excitation followed by a 2p → 1s decay.

Indirect RIXS
Indirect RIXS is slightly more complicated. Here, the incoming photon promotes a core-electron to an itinerant state far above the electronic chemical potential. Subsequently, the electron in this same state decays again, filling the core-hole. Scattering of the X-rays occurs via the core-hole potential that is present in the intermediate state. It shakes up the electronic system, creating excitations to which the X-ray photon loses energy and momentum. The number of electrons in the valence sub-system is constant throughout the process.

Applications 
 Intracellular metal speciation,  
Mott insulators

high-temperature superconductors (e.g., cuprates),

 Iron-based superconductors,

 Semiconductors (e.g. Cu2O)

 Colossal magnetoresistance manganites. 

 Metalloproteins (e.g. the oxygen-evolving complex in photosystem II) aqueous myoglobins 
 Catalysis (e.g. s,

 Water, aqueous solution, aqueous acetic acid, aqueous glycine

 High pressure.

See also
 X-ray scattering techniques
 X-ray Raman scattering (XRS)

References

External links 
 RIXS experiments at ESRF (European Synchrotron Radiation Facility).
 RIXS experiments at SLS (Swiss Light Source).
 RIXS experiments at APS (Advanced Photon Source).
 RIXS experiments at SOLEIL (France).
 Soft X-ray RIXS experiment at SOLEIL (France).

X-ray spectroscopy
X-ray scattering